

V06A Diet formulations for treatment of obesity

V06AA Low-energy diets

V06B Protein supplements
Empty group

V06C Infant formulas

V06CA Nutrients without phenylalanine

V06D Other nutrients

V06DA Carbohydrates/proteins/minerals/vitamins, combinations

V06DB Fat/carbohydrates/proteins/minerals/vitamins, combinations

V06DC Carbohydrates
V06DC01 Glucose
V06DC02 Fructose

V06DD Amino acids, including combinations with polypeptides

V06DE Amino acids/carbohydrates/minerals/vitamins, combinations

V06DF Milk substitutes

V06DX Other combinations of nutrients

References

V06